Devon Falls, known as the 'Veil of the Valley', is a waterfall in Sri Lanka, situated  west of Talawakele, Nuwara Eliya District on the A7 highway. The falls is named after a pioneer English coffee planter called Devon, whose plantation was situated nearby the falls. The falls are formed by a tributary of Kothmale Oya, which is a tributary of Mahaweli River.

See also 
 List of waterfalls of Sri Lanka
 Place names in Sri Lanka with an English name

References 

Landforms of Nuwara Eliya District
Waterfalls in Central Province, Sri Lanka